Taiwan competed as Chinese Taipei at the 2018 Winter Olympics in Pyeongchang, South Korea, from 9 to 25 February 2018, with four competitors in two sports.

Competitors
The following is the list of number of competitors participating in the delegation per sport.

Luge

Chinese Taipei qualified one male luge athlete. Lien Te-an qualified in men's singles by being ranked in the top 38 of the 2017–18 Luge World Cup standings.

Speed skating

Chinese Taipei earned the following quotas at the conclusion of the four World Cups used for qualification.

See also
Chinese Taipei at the 2017 Asian Winter Games
Chinese Taipei at the 2018 Summer Youth Olympics

References

Nations at the 2018 Winter Olympics
2018 in Taiwanese sport
2018